The Deadbeat Bang of Heartbreak City is the fourth and final studio album by American punk rock band Beach Slang. It was released on January 10, 2020, under Bridge 9 Records. In support of the album, the band announced a tour of North America with Goo Goo Dolls.

The first single from the album, "Bam Rang Rang" was released on October 14, 2019.

Critical reception
The Deadbeat Bang of Heartbreak City was met with mixed or average reviews from critics. At Metacritic, which assigns a weighted average rating out of 100 to reviews from mainstream publications, this release received an average score of 59, based on 9 reviews.

Track listing

References

2020 albums
Beach Slang albums
Bridge 9 Records albums